The Uzunköprü-Halkalı Regional is a regional rail service operated by the Turkish State Railways. The trains run between Uzunköprü in Edirne Province and Halkalı in Istanbul Province, at Thrace, northwestern Turkey.

The train operates daily on one roundtrip. The train number 12704 departs from Halkalı at 8:30, and the train number 12703 leaves Uzunköprü  at 15.40 local time. It serves twelve towns between Uzunköprü and Halkalı, among them Alpullu, Lüleburgaz, Çorlu, Çerkezköy and Çatalca. The total average travel time on the -long line is three and half hours in one direction.

The regional train operates on the historic railway line, which was constructed by French during the Ottoman Empire in the late 1800s, and was used by the Ottoman company Chemins de fer Orientaux between Istanbul and Didymoteicho, then Ottoman territory, serving Halkalı, Uzunköprü and Eskiköy. In 2012, the railway line was closed to traffic due to renovation works. On May 1, 2018, the Uzunköprü-Halkalı Regional train service resumed after six years.

Derailment
On 8 July 2018, the train number 12703 bound Halkalı derailed shortly before Çorlu due to damaged railway structure as a result of heavy rainfall. Five of the six railway cars overturned after derailment. 24 passengers were killed and 318 injured at the accident. The train service was suspended three days long during the recovery operations. The train service resumed on 11 July 2018.

References

Regional rail in Turkey
Named passenger trains of Turkey
Rail transport in Edirne
Uzunköprü District
Rail transport in Kırklareli
Rail transport in Tekirdağ
Rail transport in Istanbul
Küçükçekmece